Yang Fan (born 28 March 1996) is a Chinese footballer who currently plays for Chinese Super League side Beijing Sinobo Guoan.

Club career
Yang Fan joined China League Two side Yancheng Dingli along with Tianjin Songjiang teammate Yang Wanshun in 2016. He was scouted by Chinese Super League side Tianjin TEDA manager Uli Stielike in the 2017 season. On 28 February 2018, he transferred to Tianjin TEDA after a successful trial. He made his debut for the club on 3 March 2018, playing the whole match in a 1–1 home draw against Hebei China Fortune.

On 3 February 2020, Beijing Guoan announced that Yang Fan would join the club.

International career
On 15 December 2019 Yang Fan made his debut for the China national football team against South Korea in the 2019 EAFF E-1 Football Championship tournament that ended in a 1-0 defeat.

Career statistics

References

External links
 

1996 births
Living people
Chinese footballers
Sportspeople from Xuzhou
Footballers from Jiangsu
Tianjin Jinmen Tiger F.C. players
Beijing Guoan F.C. players
Chinese Super League players
China League Two players
Association football defenders
21st-century Chinese people